Sankharavam may refer to:

 Sankharavam (2004 film), a Telugu film
 Sankharavam (1987 film), a Telugu action film